= IIO Framework =

The Industrial Input/Output Framework (IIO Framework) is a part of the Linux kernel.
